Mount Arthur is a mountain located on Ellesmere Island, Nunavut, Canada in the Quttinirpaaq National Park. First mapped by the Lady Franklin Bay Expedition, it was named for Chester A. Arthur the 21st President of the United States.

External links

 Mount Arthur on peakvisor.com
 sunset/sunrise moonset/moonrise times
 Mount Arthur current updated weather
 Mount Arthur updated weather forecast by heights
 Mount Arthur long term updated weather forecast
 Mount Arthur historic weather data

References
Geographical Names of the Ellesmere Island National Park Reserve and Vicinity by Geoffrey Hattersley-Smith (1998) 

Notes

Arctic Cordillera
One-thousanders of Nunavut